Theoretical linguistics is a term in linguistics which, like the related term general linguistics, can be understood in different ways. Both can be taken as a reference to theory of language, or the branch of linguistics which inquires into the nature of language and seeks to answer fundamental questions as to what language is, or what the common ground of all languages is. The goal of theoretical linguistics can also be the construction of a general theoretical framework for the description of language.

Another use of the term depends on the organisation of linguistics into different sub-fields. The term theoretical linguistics is commonly juxtaposed with applied linguistics. This perspective implies that the aspiring language professional, e.g. a teacher student, must first learn the theory i.e. properties of the linguistic system, or what Ferdinand de Saussure called internal linguistics. This is followed by practice, or studies in the applied field. The dichotomy is not fully unproblematic because language pedagogy, language technology and other aspects of applied linguistics include theory, too.

Similarly, the term general linguistics is used to distinguish core linguistics from other types of study. However, because college and university linguistics is largely distributed with the institutes and departments of a relatively small number of national languages, some larger universities also offer courses and research programmes in 'general linguistics' which may cover exotic and minority languages, cross-linguistic studies and various other topics outside the scope of the main philological departments.

Fields of linguistics proper
When the concept of theoretical linguistics is taken as referring to core or internal linguistics, it means the study of the parts of the language system. This traditionally means phonology, morphology, syntax and semantics. Pragmatics and discourse can also be included; delimitation varies between institutions. Furthermore, Saussure's definition of general linguistics consists of the dichotomy of synchronic and diachronic linguistics, thus including historical linguistics as a core issue.

Linguistic theories
There are various frameworks of linguistic theory which include a general theory of language and a general theory of linguistic description. Current humanistic approaches include theories within structural linguistics and functional linguistics. Evolutionary linguistics includes various frameworks of generative grammar and cognitive linguistics.

See also 
 Theoretical Linguistics – journal
 Course in General Linguistics

References 

Formal sciences
Linguistics